The Guianan spear-nosed bat (Phyllostomus latifolius) is a bat species found in Brazil, Colombia, Guyana, Suriname and Venezuela.

References

Phyllostomidae
Bats of South America
Bats of Brazil
Mammals of Guyana
Mammals of Colombia
Bat, Guianan Spear-nosed
Mammals of Venezuela
Mammals described in 1901
Taxa named by Oldfield Thomas